Sviatoshyn Airfield (Ukrainian Аеродром «Святошин»), formerly known as Svyatoshino, is an industrial airfield in Kyiv, Ukraine, located 11 km northwest of city center. It is part of the Antonov Serial Production Plant, surrounded by the districts of Sviatoshyn, Nyvky, and Bilychi.

Sviatoshyn Airfield sometimes hosts Kyiv's aviation events such as shows or festivals, but otherwise remains inaccessible to the public. The city's main aviation museum is located near the Zhuliany Airport. 

As of 14 March 14 2022, the airport began taking heavy bombardment from invading Russian forces trying to advance further to the Ukrainian capital during the Battle of Kyiv, receiving severe damage.

See also
Aviant

References

External links

Data at Kiev Air Control Center web page
Photo gallery of Antonov airplanes taken at Sviatoshyn airfield

Airports in Kyiv
Antonov
Prospect Beresteiskyi